County Road 511 or County Route 511 may refer to:

County Road 511 (Brevard County, Florida)
County Route 511 (New Jersey)